Musselburgh Racecourse is a horse racing venue located in the Millhill area of Musselburgh, East Lothian, Scotland, UK, close to the River Esk. It is the second biggest racecourse in Scotland (the first being Ayr) and is the fourteenth biggest in the UK. In 2016, Musselburgh staged 28 fixtures. It was officially known as "Edinburgh Racecourse", and referred to as such in the English press, until the beginning of 1996 but was widely referred to as "Musselburgh" in Scotland long before that and was widely referred to as Musselburgh in the racing pages of Scottish newspapers.

The course offers both flat racing and National Hunt meetings (though it only introduced jumping in 1987) and is 2 km long. In the middle of the course is a nine-hole golf course, Musselburgh Links, dating from at least 1672. The Royal Musselburgh Golf Club was founded there in 1774.

Location

The racecourse itself sits on Musselburgh common good land. It is situated on the eastern side of the town, less than a mile from the A1 and two miles from the Edinburgh City Bypass. A road bridge over the Esk gives access to the course on race days only; the rest of the time, the gates are kept closed.

History

The first races in Musselburgh took place in 1777 under the auspices of the Royal Caledonian Hunt. Between 1789 and 1816, race meetings were held on the sands at Leith, although some races did still take place in the town. In 1816, they returned permanently to Musselburgh, to a course that had been laid out for them by the town council. The Hunt were so pleased with the new course that they distributed 50 guineas amongst the town’s poor.

After the legalisation of off course betting shops in 1961, racecourse attendances went into decline.
This hit Scotland particularly hard, with Lanark and Bogside racecourses both going bankrupt. By the 1980s Musselburgh looked to be heading the same way, and, despite a temporary financial reprieve in 1987 when racecourses began to sell pictures of races to the betting shops, it was still losing money at the start of the 1990s. 

As a result, in 1991, East Lothian Council took over the running of the racecourse from the Lothians Racing Syndicate Limited (LRS). The Council brought the racecourse to a breakeven position in one year.
In 1994, the Council and the Lothians Racing Syndicate created the Musselburgh Joint Racing Committee (MJRC) to run the racecourse, a partnership which still exists today. The Council own the racecourse facilities and assets and the MJRC pay a full commercial rent for use of the land and facilities to both the Common Good Fund and ELC.

From 1995 onwards, a £7.5 million refurbishment plan was put in place. This included a prestigious new hospitality stand (The Queen’s Stand), the refurbishment of the Edwardian Grandstand, the building of the Links Pavilion, a new weighing room and entrance complexes, a new parade ring, new stables and groundstaff facilities, extensive landscaping and improvements to the track itself.

In 2012 an all weather strip was introduced to the track to prevent the bends being chopped up.

Attendances

Annual attendance is over 70,000 per annum, up from 38,000 in 1999. Ladies' Day in June is usually the biggest day with sell-out crowds of 10,000.

Awards

In 2011, Musselburgh won the Dual Purpose Award at the Neil Wyatt Racecourse Groundstaff Awards, beating the much bigger Ascot Racecourse into second place. Musselburgh Racecourse have also won a range of awards through the RCA Showcase Awards.

Notable races
 Queen of Scots Stakes (Listed race), 7 furlongs
 William Hill Scottish Sprint Cup (Class 2 Heritage Handicap), 5 Furlongs.
 Royal Mile (Class 2 Handicap), 1 Mile.
 Edinburgh Cup (Class 3 Handicap), 1 Mile 4 Furlongs.
 Queen's Cup (Class 2 Handicap), 1 Mile 6 Furlongs.
 Edinburgh National (Class 2 Handicap Chase), 4 Miles.

References

External links
Official website
Gazetteer for Scotland
BBC article on upgrading of the racecourse
Course guide on GG.COM
Course guide on At The Races

 
Buildings and structures in East Lothian
Sports venues in East Lothian
Tourist attractions in East Lothian
Horse racing venues in Scotland
Musselburgh
Sports venues completed in 1816
1816 establishments in Scotland